Oenothera odorata is a perennial plant belonging to the genus Oenothera and native to South America.

Oenothera odorata grows to 60–90 cm (24–36 in) tall. It flowers in summer with yellow flowers which become red in time.

References

odorata
Flora of South America
Night-blooming plants